Somiani is a coastal town in the southeast of Balochistan province in Pakistan, approximately 145 kilometres northwest of Karachi. The coast of Sonmiani is the northernmost point of the Arabian Sea. The Sonmiani Beach is one of the most popular beaches near Karachi. The town also serves as a Tehsil  of Hub District . Sonmiani is noted for its space research and development. There is a space center/spaceport, which is known as Somiani Spaceport is situated at Sonmiani District. The Pakistan Economic Coordination Commission has announced a plan for construction of a liquid natural gas terminal.

Sonmiani is at one end of the world's longest estimated straight-line path over water (32,090 km, ending at the Kamchatka Peninsula in the Karaginsky District in Russia).

Port 
Sonmiani Port is a proposed fourth port in Sonmiani coastal town of Hub District, Balochistan Pakistan. The port is 160 km to the west of Karachi.

See also 
 Sonmiani Spaceport
 Sonmiani Beach
 Sonmiani Bay
 Hub District
 Gadani

External links 
 
 Astronautix.com page on Sonmiani

References 

Populated places in Hub District
Arabian Sea
Populated coastal places in Pakistan